Karun County is in Khuzestan province, Iran. The capital of the county is the city of Kut-e Abdollah. At the 2006 census, the region's population (as Kut-e Abdollah Rural District and Soveyseh Rural District of Ahvaz County) was 110,209 in 20,220 households. The following census in 2011 counted 109,324 people in 24,537 households. It was separated from Ahvaz County on 23 January 2013. At the 2016 census, the newly formed county's population was 105,872 in 27,749 households. The county's population is more than 200,000, according to governorship of the city.

Administrative divisions

The population history and structural changes of Karun County's administrative divisions over three consecutive censuses are shown in the following table. The latest census shows two districts, four rural districts, and one city.

References

 
Counties of Khuzestan Province